Kim Wilford Woods  is an art historian specialising in northern European late Gothic sculpture and is Senior Lecturer in art history at the Open University.

Career
She has a bachelor's degree in history from the University of York. She gained her PhD in art history in 1988 from the Courtauld Institute, University of London with a thesis titled 'Netherlandish Carved Wooden Altarpieces of the 15th and early 16th centuries in Britain'. She joined the Open University in 1999. She was elected as a Fellow of the Society of Antiquaries of London on 11 November 2005.

Select publications
Woods, K. W. 2017. 'The tree of Jesse gates from Scarisbrick Hall', in Davies, G. and Townsend, E. (eds.) A Reservoir of Ideas: Essays in honour of Paul Williamson. London, Paul Holberton/V&A publishing. 235–244.
Woods, K. W. 2017 'The activation of the image: expatriate carvers and kneeling effigies in late Gothic Spain', The Sculpture Journal 26/1, 11–23.
Woods, K. W. 2016. Cut in Alabaster: a material of sculpture and its European traditions 1330-1530. Harvey Miller.
Woods, K. W. 2016. 'Plantagenets in alabaster', Crooks, P., Green, D. and Ormorod, M. (eds) The Plantagenet Empire, 1259–1453. Shaun Tyas. 89–108.
Woods, K. W. 2014. 'Altarpieces in Alabaster' in Fajt, J. and Hörsch, M. (eds) Niederländische Skulpturenexporte nach Nord- und Ostmitteleuropa vom 14. bis 16. Jahrhundert (Studia Jagellonica Lipsiensia). Ostfildern. 41–58.
Woods, K. W. 2013. 'The Master of Rimini and the tradition of alabaster carving in the early 15th century Netherlands' Meaning in Materials 1400-1800, Nederlands Kunsthistorisch Jaarboek 62. 56–83.
Woods, K. W. 2007. Imported images: Netherlandish Late Gothic Sculpture in England, C.1400-c.1550''. Shaun Tyas.

References

Living people
Year of birth missing (living people)
Place of birth missing (living people)
Fellows of the Society of Antiquaries of London
Alumni of the Courtauld Institute of Art
Alumni of the University of York
Women art historians
20th-century British historians
21st-century British women writers
21st-century British historians